Harirampur Assembly constituency is an assembly constituency in Dakshin Dinajpur district in the Indian state of West Bengal.

Overview
As per orders of the Delimitation Commission, No. 42 Harirampur Assembly constituency covers Buniadpur Municipality, Harirampur community development block, and Bansihari community development block.

Harirampur Assembly constituency  is part of No. 6 Balurghat (Lok Sabha constituency).

Members of Legislative Assembly

Election results

2021

2016
In the 2016 election, Raikul Islam of CPI (M) defeated his nearest rival Biplab Mitra of Trinamool Congress

2011
In the 2011 election, Biplab Mitra of Trinamool Congress defeated his nearest rival Narayan Biswas of CPI(M).

References

Assembly constituencies of West Bengal
Politics of Dakshin Dinajpur district